Beaverkill may refer to:

In New York:
Beaverkill Bridge, a covered bridge in Sullivan County
Beaverkill Creek, a former tributary of Esopus Creek
Beaver Kill, a tributary of the East Branch of the Delaware River

See also